Maja e Ragamit is a mountain in the Accursed Mountains range in Albania. Reaching 2,472m elevation, it is located 2 km east of Maja Jezercë, the highest point of the range and the Dinaric Alps.

References

Mountains of Albania
Accursed Mountains